Andrey (Yuryevich) Korolev (born June 2, 1976, in Perm) is an Honored Traveler of Russia, President of the Federation of Sports Tourism of Perm Krai, Master of Sports of Russia in Sports Tourism.

He is a four-time champion of Russia and CIS countries in sports tourism, winner of international championships and competitions in sports tourism, head of the "Terrestrial Pole of Inaccessibility" expedition project, winner of the Stroganov Prize, Candidate of Geographical Sciences, associate professor at the Department of Tourism, Faculty of Geography, Perm State National Research University (PSU).

Biography 
Korolev graduated from the Department of Animal and Veterinary Medicine, Perm State Agricultural Academy (PSAA, 1993–1999). Later, he was a senior lecturer at the Department of Internal Non-Communicable Diseases (PSAA). Since 2004, he has been an assistant professor at the Department of Tourism, Faculty of Geography, Perm State National Research University.

Tourism activity 
Korolev started to be engaged in tourism at the age of 15, rafting along the rivers of the Kama region and climbing nearby ridges, widening the range of his travels to the Caucasus and the Polar Urals. Over time, the complexity of routes increased, and he started gradually forming his own team.

He visited the Ural region (southern, middle, northern, sub-polar, polar), east and west Sayan, Altai (Russian and Mongolian parts), the Caucasus, Tien Shan, Pamir, Kamchatka, Chinese Pamir, Putorana Plateau, Kun-Lun, Tibet, Peruvian Andes, Argentine Andes, New Zealand, Australia, Greenland, East Africa, Alaska, Antarctica and Madagascar.

The total number of expeditions by Korolev exceeds 100, of which 14 are graded the highest 6 grade of difficulty. Under his guidance, around 1,000 people participated in 1-2 grade sports expeditions, 400 of whom received qualification in sports tourism and a few became prize winners of local or national champions.

Korolev is repeatedly published in magazines such as National Geographic, National Geographic Traveler and GEO. He is a regular author and information source for various media. In 2016, Korolev became a prize winner of the "Vertical" International Festival of Mountain and Adventure Films (Moscow) in nominations "Travel Notes, Essays, Diaries" and "Illustrated Publications".

Awards 
In 2010, Andrey Korolev he was awarded the title and honorary badge "the Honored Traveler of Russia".

In 2014, he was nominated and received the Stroganov Prize for outstanding achievements in sports.

Sports achievements 
 1998: Exploring and launching new sites for ski tourism in the central Tien Shan, Ak-Shyrak massif (Russia). Initial ascent to summit named Perm Peak.
 2000: Winter ski crossing of the Pamirs, north to south, from the Alai Valley to the Bartang River, along the glaciers of Fedchenko, Vitkovsky, Grum-Grzhimailo, etc. The first-ever attempt of winter ascent to Independence Peak; successful attempt of crossing a pass of the 3A-3B grade of difficulty over the Yazgulemsky Range.
 2001: Ski expedition over the Mongolian Altai and the South Chui Ridge. The second winter visit to the tourist area, the first winter ascent to the summit peak of Tavan-Bogdo-Ula. First crossing of several passes, the second winter ascent to Nairamdal (Khüiten Peak).
 2005: Bicycle crossing of Kun-Lun and Tibet. Completed the first route of the route, the opening of a new tourist area — the pole of inaccessibility of Eurasia — the Changtang Plateau, in northern Tibet. For the first time in world tourism, Kun-Lun and Tibet were crossed from north to south, from the Taklamakan Desert to the Brahmaputra River basin — as a joint autonomous route. The route covered  and lasted 49 days with 53 passes crossed, most of them first-time ever, with the average height .
 2006: The first official sports trip to the Peruvian Andes, opening a new trekking area with a rout fully completed at the first attempt. For the first time, Russian travelers reached the Amazon source, climbed the top of the mountain above and double-named it "Peak Perm" (originally named Cerro Huaitano ; 2B grade of difficulty. Ascent to Nevado-Koropunu, one of the highest extinct volcanoes on Earth. Ascent to Mount Aconcagua, the highest point of the Southern and Western Hemisphere.
 2007: Research and sport expeditions to Australia and New Zealand.

 2009: For the first time ever, the central part of Kun-Lun and Tibet were crossed from west to east. The journey was dedicated to the 170th birthday anniversary of Nikolay Przhevalsky. The route with a duration of 36 working days covered . 44 passes were crossed, most of them for the first time. The glacial knot of the Ulugh Muztagh mountain was explored with accents to two peaks:  named the Przhevalsky Peak and  – the Roborovsky Peak. Also for the first time, in a joint autonomous route, two glacial knots were connected: the Ulugh Muztagh and the Monomakh Cap.
 2010: An attempt to ski-cross Greenland, dedicated to the 150th birthday anniversary of Fridtjof Nansen, making it one of the first officially declared sports trips in Greenland. A new tourist area was explored and opened and several passes and peaks were pioneered.
 2011: For the first time, a cycling ascent to the highest point of Africa – Mount Kilimanjaro was accomplished. Also for the first time, Kunlun, Tibet and the Himalayas were crossed from north to south through a pole of inaccessibility of Eurasia — as a joint autonomous route.
 2013: Climbing Denali (McKinley), the highest point of North America.
An attempt to ascend the Monomakh Cap was cut due to the Chinese troops' special forces, who deported the scholars from the area, forcing the team to reconsider further rout in the direction of eastern Tibet.
 2015: Expedition to the Sayan Mountains. The route passed through the most inaccessible places of Southern Siberia – Tofalaria. The highest and most beautiful pass was given the name of the 100th anniversary of Perm University. Later in 2015, Korolev took part in the first Russian meteorite expedition to Antarctica.
 2016: Planting the standard of the Perm State National Research University at one of the highest points in the US, Mount Whitney on the day of celebration of 100th PSU anniversary with a live broadcast of the event.
 2017: Skiing and cycling expedition to Alaska ( to strengthen friendly relationship between Russia and the United States, dedicated to the 150th anniversary of the purchase of Alaska and the 75th anniversary of Lend-Lease.

Chosen research and academic publications

Books and study guides (in Russian) 
 Metabolic Disorders in Animals. The Study Guide. Perm, PSU, 2005 (under the Ministry of Agriculture and Food, Russian Federation)
 The Pamires: Opportunities for Sports Tourism. Perm, Perm University Press, 2006
 Sample Routes and Evaluation of Tourist Capacities of Mountain Regions. Perm, Perm University Press, 2010
 Sustenance in Active Tourism. The Study Guide. Perm, PSU, 2011
 Equipment and Technical Skills of Active Tourism. The Study Guide. Perm, PSU, 2011
 Secrets of the Poles of Inaccessibility. Perm, Traektoria Production Center, 2015
 Secrets of the Mountains Unexplored. Perm, Traektoria Production Center, 2016

Publications (in Russian)
 "Tibet by Bikes", National Geographic Russia, #7 (34), July 2006
 Zyryanov A.I., Korolyov A.Yu, "Sample Tourist Routes: the Geographical Aspect",  Vestnik Natsional'noy Akademii Turizma (Bulletin of National Academy of Tourism), St. Petersburg, 2008, #8. pp. 53–57
 "Pushing the Limits", National Geographic Russia, June 2009. pp. 46–50
 Zyryanov A.I., Korolyov A.Yu, "Tourist Zonation of Mountain Territories", Vestnik Moskovskogo Universiteta (Bulletin of Moscow University). Ser. 5. Geography. 2009. #6. pp. 19–25
 "Tibet by Bike", National Geographic Russia, July–August 2011
 "The Pole of Inaccessibility in Eurasia", GEO, 18 January 2012
 "The Mission Possible", GEO, 12 February 2013
 "The Iced Iceland", GEO, 23 April 2013
 "The Inhabited Island: A Voyage to Madagascar", National Geographic Russia, 25 June 2013
 "The Inhabited Island", The Traveler, April–May 2013, pp 70–82
 "The Snows of the USA", GEO, 22 May 2014

Sources on Andrey Korolev (in Russian) 
 Andrey Korolev. Autor’s Page on Geo // GEO.
 Andrey Yuryevich Korolev // Perm Community.

Travelers
1976 births
Living people
Sportspeople from Perm, Russia
Academic staff of Perm State University